Gold Diggers of Broadway is a 1929 American pre-Code musical comedy film directed by Roy Del Ruth and starring Winnie Lightner and Nick Lucas. Distributed by Warner Bros., the film is the second all-talking, all-Technicolor feature-length film (after On with the Show!, also released that year by Warner Bros).

Gold Diggers of Broadway became a box office sensation, making Winnie Lightner a worldwide star and boosting guitarist crooner Nick Lucas to further fame as he sang two songs that became 20th-century standards: "Tiptoe Through the Tulips" and "Painting the Clouds with Sunshine."

Based on the 1919 play The Gold Diggers—which was also turned into a silent film of the same name in 1923—Gold Diggers of Broadway utilized showgirls, Technicolor, and sound as its main selling points.

It was chosen as one of the ten best films of 1929 by Film Daily. As with many early Technicolor films, no complete print survives, although the last twenty minutes do, but missing are a bridging sequence and the last minute of the film. Contemporary reviews, the soundtrack and the surviving footage suggest that the film was a fast-moving comedy which was enhanced by Technicolor and a set of lively and popular songs. It encapsulates the spirit of the flapper era, giving a glimpse of a world about to be changed by the Great Depression.

Because Gold Diggers of Broadway has been considered a partially lost film since the 1970s, the loose remake, Gold Diggers of 1933, is the most frequently seen version of the story.

Plot
The film opens on an audience watching a lavish 1929 Broadway show, featuring a giant gold mine production number ("Song of the Gold Diggers"). Famous guitarist Nick Lucas sings "Painting the Clouds with Sunshine", which climaxes on stage with a huge art deco revolving sun.

Backstage, the star of the show (Ann Pennington) fights over Nick with another girl. Also introduced are a group of chorus girls who are 'man hungry'. They are all looking for love and money, but are not sure which is the more important. They are visited by a faded star who is reduced to selling cosmetic soap. They gossip about how they all want a man with plenty of money, so they do not end up the same way.

Businessman Stephen Lee (Conway Tearle) angrily forbids his nephew Wally (William Bakewell) to marry Violet, one of the showgirls. A corpulent lawyer friend, Blake (Albert Gran), advises him to befriend the showgirl first before making a decision. The showgirls are friends who stick together, and the most raucous girl called Mabel (Winnie Lightner) takes a fancy to Blake, calling him 'sweetie' and showing her appreciation by singing him a song ("Mechanical Man").

That evening, they all visit a huge nightclub. Mabel ends up on a table singing another song to Blake, "Keeping the Wolf from the Door", before jumping into his lap. Showgirl Jerry (Nancy Welford) moves the party to her apartment. Everyone gets drunk and after seeing Ann Pennington dance on the kitchen table, Lee decides he is 'getting to like these showgirls'. Blake says he is 'losing his mind or just plain mad'. Keeping the fun going, Lucas sings "Tiptoe Through the Tulips." Complications come thick and fast after a balloon game, with both Blake and Lee falling under the spell of Mabel and Jerry. The party ends with Lucas singing "Go to Bed" and Jerry contriving to get Lee back after everyone has left. She gets him more drunk whilst tipping her own drinks away when he is not looking. Her aim is to get Lee to agree to allow Wally to marry. To do this, she lies and is shown up by her own mother, who accidentally finds them together.

Next morning, Jerry feels disgraced. Mabel has been given an extra line for the show "I am the spirit of the ages and the progress of civilization", but cannot get the words right. Lucas is told off for singing poor songs and sings another "What will I do without you". Ann Pennington fights with another showgirl and hurts her eye. Jerry is asked to take her place as the star of the evening performance. Mabel receives a proposal of marriage from Blake, but worries about her extra line.

The show starts with Nick Lucas reprising "Tiptoe Through the Tulips"' with full orchestra in a huge stage set that shows girl tulips in a huge greenhouse. Backstage, Uncle Steve comes back to give his consent to his nephew and to tell Jerry he wants to marry her.

The finale starts with Jerry leading the "Song of the Gold Diggers" against a huge art deco backdrop of Paris at night. Various acrobats and girls litter the stage as all the songs are reprised in a fast moving, lavish production number. Finally, male choristers lift Mabel into the air, whereupon she strikes a pose resembling the Statue of Liberty and exclaims, "I am . . . I am . . . Oh, darn it, I've forgotten that second line!" The music swells, and the film comes to its glorious end.

Cast

 Nancy Welford as Jerry Lamar 
 Conway Tearle as Stephen Lee 
 Winnie Lightner as Mabel Munroe
 Ann Pennington as Ann Collins
 Gertrude Short as Topsy St Clair
 Lilyan Tashman as Eleanor
 William Bakewell as Wally Saunders 
 Nick Lucas as Nick
 Helen Foster as Violet Dayne
 Albert Gran as Blake
 Julia Swayne Gordon as Cissy Gray
 Lee Moran as Dance Director
 Armand Kaliz as Barney Barnett

Cast notes:
 Winnie Lightner became one of Warner Bros. biggest stars in 1930. She starred in two lavish Technicolor features in that year: Hold Everything and The Life of the Party. Winnie Lightner's first appearance as the title character in the 1931 Olsen & Johnson comedy Gold Dust Gertie pays homage to her success in Gold Diggers of Broadway by utilizing "Song of the Gold Diggers" as the musical underscoring during this sequence. Her flapperish care-free demeanor became decidedly dated as the conservatism of the 1930s took its course and this probably explains why she retired from films in 1934.
 Director Roy Del Ruth began a relationship with Winnie Lightner in 1929, but they did not marry until 1948.
 The only actors in the 1929 film to have also appeared in the 1923 silent version, The Gold Diggers, were Gertrude Short and Louise Beavers. Largely forgotten today, Short is perhaps best known to film buffs as the aggressive reporter who hounds Robert Armstrong in the opening reel of Son of Kong (1933). Beavers, who made her (uncredited) film debut in the silent The Gold Diggers would eventually make 156 film appearances, many of them as scene-stealing maids, and played "Beulah" for a season on the television series of that name. She also starred with Claudette Colbert in the original 1934 version of Imitation of Life, largely considered her greatest role.

Production
The song "Painting the Clouds with Sunshine" was originally the main theme for the film. After Nick Lucas signed up for the film  – he was hired by Darryl Zanuck – the film was spotted as a potential hit and "Tiptoe Through the Tulips" was written to enlarge the film; Zanuck provided an extra production number for the tune.  The song was later performed in a much different version by the camp singer Tiny Tim, who recorded it as a novelty, accompanying himself on ukulele. The notoriety attached a stigma to the tune that would remain. However, Lucas was a favorite of Tiny Tim's, and even appeared as a guest at Tim's noted wedding ceremony on The Tonight Show in 1969, singing the song together.

The two production numbers for "Painting the Clouds with Sunshine" and "Tiptoe Through the Tulips" both start on a smaller set and move to a larger one. To change between sets while the song was sung and create a seamless transition, instead of using a curtain, a shot of a stagehand was shown, throwing a sparking electric lighting switch which darkens one scene out and fades in another. The basic storyline was modified and reused in later Warner Bros. films such as Gold Diggers of 1933 (1933) and Painting the Clouds with Sunshine (1951).

Majestic Pictures attempted to cash in on the "Gold Diggers" concept by naming a feature Gold Diggers of Paris, but Warner Bros. prevented that via legal action. Warner Bros. released a film called Gold Diggers in Paris in 1938.

Technicolor

Gold Diggers of Broadway was filmed in Technicolor. According to Herbert Kalmus, the co-founder and President of the company, the system Technicolor used at that time was a subtractive imbibition two-color process introduced in 1928 that utilized filters and a normal-thickness dye-transfer print, as opposed to two prints cemented together, as had previously been the case.  Warner Bros. was one of the primary users of the new system, although other studios utilized it as well, often for color sequences within an otherwise black-and-white film.  Warner Bros., however, often made films that were color throughout: In 1930, they released 15 films that used two-color Technicolor, only four of which used color only for limited sequences.

Songs

 ¶ – Indicates songs with music by Joseph Burke and lyrics by Al Dubin.

 ¶ – "Song of the Gold Diggers" (WB Vitaphone orchestra and stage chorus)
 ¶ – "Painting the Clouds with Sunshine" (Nick Lucas with WB Vitaphone orchestra and stage chorus)
 ¶ – "And Still They Fall in Love" (Winnie Lightner with backing)
 ¶ – "Song of the Gold Diggers" (Nancy Welford)
 ¶ – "Mechanical Man" (Winnie Lightner with backing)
 ¶ – "Painting the Clouds with Sunshine" – reprise (Nick Lucas with band)
 ¶ – "Keeping the Wolf from the Door" (Winnie Lightner with band)
 ¶ – "Tip-toe thru the Tulips" (Nick Lucas with guitar and band). This song was nominated for the American Film Institute's 2004 list AFI's 100 Years...100 Songs.
 "The Pennington Glide" (Instrumental – Apartment Party Sequence) (Title cited in script)
 ¶ – "In a Kitchenette" (Nick Lucas on guitar)
 ¶ – "Go to Bed" (Nick Lucas on guitar)
 ¶ – "What Will I Do Without You?" (Nick Lucas on guitar)
 ¶ – "Tiptoe Through the Tulips" – reprise (Nick Lucas with WB Vitaphone orchestra and chorus)
 ¶ – Finale featuring Nancy Welford with WB Vitaphone orchestra – "Song of the Gold Diggers" introduction/"Tip-toe thru the Tulips" (instrumental WB Vitaphone orchestra) /"Painting the Clouds with Sunshine" (instrumental WB Vitaphone orchestra) and chorus/"Mechanical Man" (instrumental WB Vitaphone orchestra) / Nancy Welford with WB Vitaphone orchestra – "Song of the Gold Diggers" – reprise and finale.

Reception

Box office
According to Warner Bros records, the film earned $2,540,000 domestically and $1,427,000 foreign. It was the studio's most popular film of the year.

Critical
Contemporary reviews by film critics were very positive. Mordaunt Hall wrote in his review for The New York Times:

The fun, coupled with the lovely pastel shades, the tuneful melodies, a sensible narrative, competent acting and elaborate stage settings, resulted in an extraordinarily pleasing entertainment. It caused one to meditate in the end on the remarkable progress of the screen, for not only are the voices reproduced with rare precision, but every opportunity is taken of the Technicolor process in producing the hues and glitter of a musical comedy.

Variety called it "a very good entertainment on the screen" and highly acclaimed Lightner's performance, writing, "Somebody tossed the picture right into Winnie Lightner's lap, or else she stole it." It, too, was very impressed by the color process, writing, "While the Warners' Say It with Songs is also an all-colored talker, somehow here the Technicolor process appears to give a greater strength to the picture; a part of it."

John Mosher of The New Yorker gave the film a positive review, calling the songs "exceptionally audible" and "unusually good". Film Daily said it had "good music" and a story that was "generally amusing even if not particularly substantial", concluding that Lightner "does much to send the picture over."

Preservation

Gold Diggers of Broadway was filmed using the Vitaphone sound-on-disc system and released on ten reels of full frame 35mm nitrate film, two-component imbibition prints by Technicolor, with accompanying Vitaphone soundtrack discs. The discs, including the overture, have survived, but until around 1986 nothing was believed to have survived of the prints. At that time, an original print of the final reel, minus the final minute, was donated to the British Film Institute. It was copied to safety film and thus preserved. Nearly ten years later, another reel was discovered in Australia, the end of the distribution line. It proved to be the penultimate reel, featuring the "Tip-toe Through the Tulips" production number. It was missing a short bridging sequence. Only three brief fragments from earlier reels are known to survive: a few seconds from the "Song of the Gold Diggers" number, in black-and-white and with superimposed text, in the trailer for Gold Diggers of 1937; a 35mm nitrate fragment from the same number, running about twenty seconds, found included with a toy projector bought on eBay; and another 35mm nitrate fragment, also running less than a minute, from a non-musical scene featuring Lightner and Gran, which was found with fragments from another film in a small museum. The first three reels of this film (2463 feet or a total of 27 minutes) exist at the BFI archive in a 35mm color print.  In addition, the BFI holds various excerpts in color. 

Two excerpts from the film were to have been released as bonus features on the 80th Anniversary 3-Disc Deluxe Edition DVD of The Jazz Singer, but due to an error only one was included. The excerpt identified as "Tip-toe Through the Tulips" is actually the finale, and the excerpt identified as the finale is actually a ballet sequence from MGM's The Rogue Song, another two-color Technicolor film for which only fragments of the picture element are known to exist. The correct pair of excerpts can be found on the Warner Bros. DVD release of Gold Diggers of 1937.

In popular culture
Gold Diggers of Broadway is referenced in Michael Moorcock's book Breakfast in the Ruins. In a scene set in 1929, an American boy takes his girlfriend to see it.

See also 
 List of early color feature films
 List of incomplete or partially lost films
 List of early Warner Bros. talking features

References

External links

Gold Diggers of Broadway Soundtrack on Internet Archive

 (Gold Diggers of Broadway clip starts at 4:53)

1929 films
1929 musical comedy films
1920s color films
American musical comedy films
1920s English-language films
Films about musical theatre
Films based on musicals
Films directed by Roy Del Ruth
Films set in New York City
Lost American films
Warner Bros. films
Films set in 1929
Films with screenplays by Robert Lord (screenwriter)
Lost musical comedy films
1929 lost films
Early color films
1920s American films